Karthika Deepam is a 1979 Indian Telugu-language film directed by Laxmi Deepak and starring Sobhan Babu, Sridevi and Sharada. The music score by Chellapilla Satyam are memorable. Sobhan Babu won Filmfare Best Actor Award (Telugu). The film was declared a blockbuster at the box office.

The film was remade as Maang Bharo Sajana (1980) in Hindi directed by T. Rama Rao, in Tamil as Karpoora Deepam (1985) and in Kannada as Sowbhagya Lakshmi (1987).

Cast 
 Sobhan Babu   ...   Sridhara Rao and Raja
 Sharada
 Sridevi   ...    Radha
 Geetha   ...     Geetha
 Gummadi
 Leelavathi
 M. Prabhakar Reddy   ...    Dhananjaya Rao
 Rajababu
 Allu Ramalingaiah
 K. V. Chalam   ...    Driver
 Suryakantham
 Ramaprabha
 Potti Prasad
 Mada
 YG Mahendra

Soundtrack 
 "Aaraneekuma Ee Deepam Karthika Deepam" (Lyricist: Devulapalli Krishna Sastry; Singers: P. Susheela, S. Janaki; Cast: Sridevi and Sharada)
 "Chilakamma Palikindhi Chiguraaku Kulikindi" (Lyricist: Narala Rami Reddy; Singers: S. P. Balasubrahmanyam, S. Janaki; Cast: Shobhan Babu and Sridevi)
 "Chooda Chakkani Daana" (Lyricist: Gopi; Singers: S. P. Balasubrahmanyam, P. Susheela; Cast: Shobhan Babu and Geetha)
 "Muvvalemo Nedemo Naalona Mroginchenu Mohana Geetam" (Lyricist: Dr. C. Narayana Reddy; Singer: S. Janaki; Cast: Sridevi)
 "Nee Kougililo Taladachi Nee Chetulalo Kanumoosi" (Lyricist: Gopi; Singers: S. P. Balasubrahmanyam, S. Janaki; Cast: Shobhan Babu and Sridevi)
 "Ey Maata Aha Telusu Adi Kaadu" (Lyricist: Gopi; Singers: S. P. Balasubrahmanyam, P. Susheela; Cast: Shobhan Babu and Sharada)

Release 
The film was released on 4 May 1979. It received positive reviews from critics and audience alike.
The film became a phenomenal success at the box office and was one of the highest grossing Telugu movies of the year 1979. It had a theatrical run of 93 days in Hyderabad, 56 days in Secunderabad, 113 days in Vijayawada, 100 days in Rajahmundry, 100 days in Eluru and 118 days in Vishakhapatnam.

References

External links 
 

1970s Telugu-language films
1979 films
Films scored by Satyam (composer)
Telugu films remade in other languages